KTIJ 106.9 FM is a radio station licensed to Elk City, Oklahoma. The station broadcasts a Contemporary Hit Radio format and is owned by Fuchs Radio, LLC.

Translator

References

External links
KTIJ's website

TIJ
Contemporary hit radio stations in the United States